This is a list of seasons played by Santa Teresa CD, a women's football club from Badajoz, Extremadura that currently plays in the Spain's top-tier Primera División.

Summary

References

Santa Teresa CD
Santa Teresa CD
women's seasons
Association football lists by Spanish club